John T. Medcalf (June 13, 1843 – May 22, 1899) was an American politician in the state of Washington. He served in the Washington House of Representatives from 1889 to 1891.

References

Republican Party members of the Washington House of Representatives
1843 births
1899 deaths
19th-century American politicians